Frankston is a town in Anderson County, Texas, United States. With a population of 1,126 at the 2020 United States census, it is one of the most populous communities of the county area.

History
Two theories are given as to how Frankston got its name. The one most accepted—and shown on the city's official website—is that Frankston was named for Frankie Miller, a young woman who donated land for the downtown city park. An alternate theory for the name of the town was that Frankston was named after Frank Miller, who owned the land when the railway was built. The Miller house still stands as a historical landmark in the southeast part of town, on ACR 19. The state bought the land from him and named the city in his honor. The original Main Street still holds the name Miller Street. The junction of Highways 155 and 175 is now the center of the town.

Geography

Frankston is located in northeastern Anderson County at  (32.053827, –95.506528), at the intersection of U.S. Highway 175 and State Highway 155.

The climate in this area is characterized by hot, humid summers and generally mild to cool winters. According to the Köppen climate classification system, Frankston has a humid subtropical climate, Cfa on climate maps.

Demographics

As of the 2020 United States census, there were 1,126 people, 456 households, and 317 families residing in the town.

According to the 2000 United States census, there were 1,209 people residing in the town of Frankston. Per 2000's census statistics, the racial and ethnic makeup of the town was 86.68% White, 10.92% African American, 0.17% Native American, 0.08% Asian, 0.91% from other races, and 1.24% from two or more races. Hispanics or Latino Americans of any race were 2.81% of the population. By 2020, its non-Hispanic white and Black or African American population remained the majority.

The town's population had a median household income of $46,250 in 2020, up from $28,125 in 2000. About 12.8% of families and 17.1% of the population lived at or below the poverty line, including 14.0% of those under age 18 and 25.6% of those age 65 or over according to the 2000 U.S. census.

Government
Frankston's City Hall building, on the west side of downtown, also includes its police department and an annex for the Anderson County sheriff's department. Frankston is served by a volunteer fire department. Anderson County operates a subcourthouse located on the southwest corner of Frankston's downtown square. The U.S. Postal Service operates a post office at 400 E. Main Street.

Education
Frankston is served by the Frankston Independent School District.

Transportation
 U.S. Highway 175
 State Highway 155
 Farm to Market Road 19

A railroad line operated by the Southern Pacific Railroad (originally built and operated by the Texas & New Orleans Railroad) served Frankston from 1902 until its abandonment in the mid-1980s.  The only remaining vestige of the rail line in the city is a building used by the railroad company as a depot; it now serves as Frankston's public library.

Notable people
Frank Beard, drummer for ZZ Top
Herbert H. Reynolds, 11th president of Baylor University

References

External links
City of Frankston official website
Frankston City Park historical marker from Texas Historic Sites Atlas (Texas Historical Commission)
Frankston Railroad Depot historical marker from Texas Historic Sites Atlas (Texas Historical Commission)

Towns in Anderson County, Texas
Towns in Texas
U.S. Route 175